Princess Ida Caroline of Waldeck and Pyrmont (26 September 1796 – 12 April 1869) was a member of the House of Waldeck and Pyrmont and a Princess of Waldeck and Pyrmont. Through her marriage to George William, Prince of Schaumburg-Lippe, Ida was also a member of the House of Lippe and Princess consort of Schaumburg-Lippe.

Early life
Ida was born in Rhoden, Waldeck and Pyrmont and was the second-eldest child and eldest daughter of George I, Prince of Waldeck and Pyrmont and his first wife Princess Auguste of Schwarzburg-Sondershausen.

Marriage and issue
Ida married George William, Prince of Schaumburg-Lippe, son of Philip II Ernest, Count of Schaumburg-Lippe and his second wife Princess Juliane of Hesse-Philippsthal, on 23 June 1816 in Arolsen, Principality of Waldeck and Pyrmont. Ida and George William had nine children:

Adolphus I, Prince of Schaumburg-Lippe (1 August 1817 – 8 May 1893)
Princess Mathilde of Schaumburg-Lippe (11 September 1818 – 14 August 1891) married Duke Eugen of Württemberg (1820–1875)
Princess Adelheid, Duchess of Schleswig-Holstein-Sonderburg-Glücksburg (9 March 1821 – 30 July 1899)
Prince Ernst of Schaumburg-Lippe (12 December 1822 – 2 April 1831)
Princess Ida of Schaumburg-Lippe (26 May 1824 – 5 March 1894)
Princess Emma of Schaumburg-Lippe (24 December 1827 – 23 January 1828)
Prince William of Schaumburg-Lippe (12 December 1834 – 4 April 1906); married Princess Bathildis of Anhalt-Dessau.
Prince Hermann of Schaumburg-Lippe (31 October 1839 – 23 December 1839)
Princess Elisabeth of Schaumburg-Lippe (5 March 1841 – 30 November 1926); married Prince Wilhelm of Hanau and Horowitz, a morganatic son of Frederick William, Elector of Hesse.

Ancestry

References

House of Waldeck and Pyrmont
House of Lippe
1796 births
1869 deaths
People from Waldeck (state)
Princesses of Waldeck and Pyrmont
Princesses of Schaumburg-Lippe
People from Bad Arolsen
Daughters of monarchs